Jabaina is a genus of moths in the subfamily Lymantriinae. The genus was erected by Paul Griveaud in 1976.

Species
Some species of this genus are:
Jabaina albimacula Griveaud, 1977
Jabaina ania (Hering, 1926)
Jabaina apicimacula Griveaud, 1977
Jabaina betschi Griveaud, 1977
Jabaina cowani Griveaud, 1977
Jabaina gutierrezi Griveaud, 1977
Jabaina hiaraka Griveaud, 1977
Jabaina ithystropha (Collenette, 1939)
Jabaina lakato Griveaud, 1977
Jabaina sakaraha (Collenette, 1959)
Jabaina sogai Griveaud, 1977
Jabaina uteles (Collenette, 1936)

References

Lymantriinae
Noctuoidea genera